Kahlil Hill (born March 18, 1979) is a professional American and Canadian football wide receiver. He was drafted in the sixth round of the 2002 NFL Draft. He has played for the Atlanta Falcons, New Orleans Saints, Detroit Lions, Buffalo Bills, and Jacksonville Jaguars of the National Football League and the Saskatchewan Roughriders, Hamilton Tiger-Cats, and BC Lions of the Canadian Football League.

References

External links 
 Tiger-Cats biography
 Hawkeyes biography

1979 births
Living people
Sportspeople from Iowa City, Iowa
Players of American football from Iowa
American players of Canadian football
American football wide receivers
Canadian football wide receivers
Iowa Hawkeyes football players
Atlanta Falcons players
New Orleans Saints players
Detroit Lions players
Buffalo Bills players
Jacksonville Jaguars players
Saskatchewan Roughriders players
Hamilton Tiger-Cats players
BC Lions players